is a railway station on the Kagoshima Main Line, operated by JR Kyushu in Minami-ku, Fukuoka City, Fukuoka Prefecture, Japan.

Lines

Layout
The station consists of two side platforms serving two tracks.

Adjacent stations

History
The station was opened by Japanese National Railways (JNR) on 3 March 1987 as a temporary stop on the existing Kagoshima Main Line track. Shortly thereafter, with the privatization of JNR on 1 April 1987, JR Kyushu took over control and upgraded it to a full station.

Passenger statistics
In fiscal 2016, the station was used by an average of 4,967 passengers daily (boarding passengers only), and it ranked 39th among the busiest stations of JR Kyushu.

See also 
List of railway stations in Japan

References

External links
Sasabaru (JR Kyushu)

Railway stations in Fukuoka Prefecture
Railway stations in Japan opened in 1987